The Nanneri (நன்னெறி) is a Tamil poem containing forty stanzas (Venpaas), written by Siva Prakasar, who lived during the late 17th and early 18th centuries.

Overview
"Nanneri" is compiled as four – four lines,  which is termed as "Venpa" as per the Thamizh grammar.

Poet
Siva prakasar, a Tamil Phiolospher, Sage, Poet lived at the end of the 17th century. He is  also called as ‘Siva anuputhi selvar, ‘Karpanai Kalangiyam’, ‘Thurai mangalam Sivaprakasar’ for the benefit of the human beings. Sivaprakasa swamigal, a  Shaiva Siddhanta. contributed more than 34 books for the Thamizh Literature.

What Nanneri says
These poems are particularly written for the sake of human beings to cultivate them. It is a collection of venpaas, which preach about the noble qualities, which man should have to follow to lead a thorough life.

Verses and Explanation
Each Venpa of  Nanneri is generally named by the first few words of the poem. These are given first and a translation into verse given then:-

Translations
Nanneri is also translated into various languages like   English verses., Hindi, Kannada, Telugu....

References

Tamil-language literature
Shaiva texts
Hymns
Sangam literature
17th-century poems